Eliot Mary Salt (born 18 January 1994) is an English actress, comedian, theatre maker, and writer.

Early life and education
Salt is from Stockport, Greater Manchester. She studied English at the University of Bristol and later trained in Acting at the London Academy of Music and Dramatic Art (LAMDA).

Career
Salt made her television debut in 2019 in 4 episodes of the Channel 4 sitcom GameFace. In 2020, Salt began playing Evelyn in the Sky One spy comedy series Intelligence. She also appeared as Joanna, Marianne's friend at Trinity College Dublin, in the BBC Three and Hulu miniseries Normal People. She starred as Terra in the 2021 Netflix series Fate: The Winx Saga.

She was cast in Manor at the National Theatre.

Deadpan Theatre and Mack and Salt
Salt founded Deadpan Theatre with Artemis Fitzalan Howard in 2013. The pair co-wrote Low Tide in Glass Bay, Changing Partners, and Get Your Shit Together.

It was here Salt formed a comedy duo with Jude Mack, whom she met at university, later known as Mack and Salt. Mack and Salt's productions through Deadpan include Predrinks / After Party and Third Wheel. It was announced in January 2021 that BBC Three had picked up Mack and Salt's pilot Amicable, a screen adaptation of the former, which they would write and star in.

Personal life
Salt lives in London with her girlfriend.

Filmography

Stage

Audio

References

External links

Living people
1994 births
21st-century English actresses
21st-century English comedians
Actors from Stockport
Alumni of the London Academy of Music and Dramatic Art
Alumni of the University of Bristol
Comedians from Manchester
English women comedians
English women dramatists and playwrights
British LGBT comedians
English LGBT actors
English stage actresses
English lesbian actresses
20th-century LGBT people
21st-century English LGBT people